Dropbox was a five-piece American rock band formed in 2002 in New York City. Their debut album, Dropbox, was released on the Universal Records label with the help of Sully Erna.

History
The band's self-titled 2004 album charted at number 182 on the Billboard 200 chart. It had a minor hit song in "Wishbone" which received some air time on MTV2 and Fuse and was featured in TV commercials.

During the group's brief existence, frontman John Kosco provided guest vocals on Godsmack's acoustic release, "Touché", which found moderate success as well.

Post-Dropbox
After the demise of Dropbox, Kosco and Joe Wilkinson formed a new group with bassist John Freeman and drummer Chris Hamilton, formerly of Bloodsimple, called Saint Caine. Lee Richards went on to join his former Godsmack bandmates in Another Animal as a second guitarist.

Discography
Dropbox (2004)

References

External links
 Dropbox on Facebook

Alternative rock groups from New York (state)
Hard rock musical groups from New York (state)
Musical groups established in 2002
2002 establishments in New York City